Hanmer Conservation Park is a protected area in the Hurunui District and Canterbury Region of New Zealand's South Island.

Geography

History

The park was established in 1978.

References

Forest parks of New Zealand
Parks in Canterbury, New Zealand
Hurunui District
1978 establishments in New Zealand
Protected areas established in 1978